The , or Sony kill switch, is an urban legend that electronic devices produced by Sony are equipped with a timer which, upon reaching a deliberately preset deadline, causes the product to stop functioning, forcing the user to buy a replacement. The legend began in Japan in the 1980s and was later repeated in other countries. The idea of products being designed to stop working after a period of time is known as planned obsolescence.

History
In Japan, Sony timer's legend spread around in the late 1980s and early 1990s and, although there has never been any conclusive evidence that would confirm this myth, many Japanese people believe it, and it 's used as a joke in comics and posted on online message boards. The legend remained confined to Japan until 2006 when there was a recall of over 4 million Dell laptops equipped with a defective Sony lithium ion battery, bringing back the legend of planned obsolescence among the Japanese people, who accused the Tokyo company.

The problem for Sony was the rumor's impact: as the company came out from the Japanese economic miracle and the kaizen ideology, it was in a very delicate situation which it tried to contain in every way, but the rumor inevitably came to the knowledge of consumers outside of Japan via the Internet. Although sales of the PlayStation 3 were not particularly affected by this urban legend, it did negatively affect sales of Sony Vaio laptop computers which, since 2007, were viewed with increasing suspicion by consumers. In addition to this, Google Trends signaled an increasing number of Internet searches indicating how Japanese purchasers found various problems with Vaio laptops.

A worsening of the situation occurred when, officially due to a software bug, it came to light that many Bravia televisions were predisposed with an operating time of about 1200 hours before they stopped functioning; Stranger still was the fact that, used for a period of about 3 hours a day, such televisions would stop working exactly after warranty expired. The Tokyo company denied any direct responsibility and announced to release software patches as a solution, desperately trying to limit the rumors about the problem before they spread to Europe, where the company's presence was very strong, and admitting: "Our products are not designed to work badly".

However, the Sony timer legend had already spread widely across the World Wide Web, becoming part of the Internet culture itself.

The legend resurfaced again in 2021 when it was discovered that an anti-cheat measure in PlayStation Network had the potential to render games unplayable on the PlayStation 3, PlayStation 4 and PlayStation 5 due to their reliance on maintaining a mandatory accurate date and time setting, whether through connection to the network or a CMOS battery, in a phenomenon known as the C-bomb.  Following outcry over the issue, Sony released a firmware update for the PS4 in late September 2021 that resolved the problem for this console, and did the same for the PS5 over a month later.

References

External links
 Sony timer

Ethically disputed business practices
Japanese urban legends
Obsolescence
Product expiration
Sony
Urban legends
Conspiracy theories in Asia